is a railway station in Arakawa, Tokyo, Japan, operated by Tokyo Metropolitan Bureau of Transportation (Toei).

Lines 
Kumanomae Station is served by the following two lines.
Nippori-Toneri Liner
Tokyo Sakura Tram

Station Layout
The Nippori-Toneri Liner elevated station consists of a single island platform serving two tracks.

History 
The station opened on 1 April 1913 as a tram stop on the Arakawa Line. The Nippori-Toneri Liner station opened on 30 March 2008 with the opening of the Nippori Toneri Liner.

Station numbering was introduced in November 2017 with Kumanomae receiving station number NT04 for the Nippori-Toneri Liner and SA09 for the Toden Arakawa Line.

See also
 List of railway stations in Japan

References

External links
Toden Kumanomae Station 
Nippori Toneri Liner Kumanomae Station 

Railway stations in Tokyo
Railway stations in Japan opened in 1913
Nippori-Toneri Liner
Arakawa, Tokyo
Railway stations in Japan opened in 2008